Gogunta is a village in Eluru district of the Indian state of Andhra Pradesh. It is located in Pedapadu mandal of Eluru revenue division. Nuzvid railway station is the nearest railway station.

Demographics 

 Census of India, Gogunta had a population of 708. The total population constitute, 348 males and 360 females with a sex ratio of 1034 females per 1000 males. 62 children are in the age group of 0–6 years with sex ratio of 1214. The average literacy rate stands at 67.80%.

References 

Villages in Eluru district